Caillat is a French surname, and may refer to:

 Colbie Caillat (born 1985), American singer-songwriter
 Colette Caillat (1921-2007), French professor
 Dominique Caillat (born 1956), Swiss playwright
 Ken Caillat (born 1946), American record producer
 Stéphane Caillat (1928-2020), French composer

French-language surnames